N-acetylglucosaminidase, alpha is a protein that in humans is encoded by the NAGLU gene.

Function 

This gene encodes an enzyme that degrades heparan sulfate by hydrolysis of terminal N-acetyl-D-glucosamine residues in N-acetyl-alpha-D-glucosaminides.

Clinical significance 

Defects in this gene are the cause of mucopolysaccharidosis type IIIB (MPS-IIIB), also known as Sanfilippo syndrome B. This disease is characterized by the lysosomal accumulation and urinary excretion of heparan sulfate.

References

Further reading